"Spidey Super Stories" is a live-action, recurring skit on the original version of the Children's Television Workshop series The Electric Company.

Overview
Episodes featured the Marvel Comics character Spider-Man, provided to the Children's Television Workshop free of charge, and was played (always in costume) by puppeteer and dancer Danny Seagren. It premiered during the premiere of The Electric Company's fourth (1974–1975) season, show 391. It predated the pilot film of the series The Amazing Spider-Man by three years, becoming the first live-action rendition of Spider-Man, and was the first live-action rendition of a Marvel character in any medium since the Captain America serial of 1944.

Stories involved the masked superhero foiling mischievous characters who were involved in petty criminal activities, although sometimes the crooks would commit more serious crimes such as assault or larceny. The cast of The Electric Company played the roles of the various characters in each story, with another serving as narrator. In many of these sketches, in keeping with Stan Lee's writing style, viewers were addressed as "true believers".

Unlike other live-action and cartoon productions of Spider-Man, this version of the web-slinging hero did not speak out loud, instead communicating only with word balloons (having a similar role to Clarabell the Clown of Howdy Doody), in order to encourage young viewers to practice their reading skills. Due to the series' budget limitations, comic book panels were interspersed through each skit in lieu of special effects. Aside from Spider-Man himself, no characters from the comic series ever appeared on "Spidey Super Stories".

Theme song
The theme song that plays at the beginning and end of the shorts was written by Gary William Friedman. The lyrics are as follows:

Spider-Man, where are you coming from?
Spider-Man, nobody knows who you are!
Spider-Man, you've got that Spidey touch
Spider-Man, you are a web-slinging star!

Episodes
Approximately one dozen "Spidey Super Stories" segments were produced during The Electric Company's 1974–1975 season, with another twelve or so during the 1975–1976 season, and further episodes during the series' final season.

A 4-DVD boxed set was released by Shout! Factory and Sony BMG Music Entertainment on February 7, 2006, named The Best of Electric Company. It featured 20 episodes from 1971–1977 (D4D 34121), three of which contained Spidey segments.

A second 4-DVD boxed set with 20 shows from 1971–1976 was released on November 14, 2006 (82666-31014). Two of the episodes in this boxed set featured Spidey segments; however, in several of the other episodes, the Spider-Man segments were edited out to minimize the appearance of the character because of rights issues. Episode 60A, from season five, which featured a Spider-Man sketch as the sketch of the day, was altered drastically from the version that originally aired on television.

Another DVD named The Best of the Best of Electric Company, a truncated version of the volume-one boxed set, was released on March 7, 2006 (DD 31006).

1974–75
A number of episodes from season 1 (season 4 of The Electric Company) featured Spidey battling the villain in the screenshot of the comic book cover. Other only had a standard picture of Spidey alone. This is documented in the chart below.

1975–76

1976–77

In other media

Comics 
From 1974 to 1982, Marvel Comics published a comic book called Spidey Super Stories, which was aimed at children ages 6–10. A total of 57 issues were produced, the first 15 of which were written by Jean Thomas (previously writer of Night Nurse). Jim Salicrup succeeded her as the series writer, and most issues were drawn by Win Mortimer. Thomas and Salicrup remarked that the comic was subject to an exceptionally high level of editorial scrutiny, as staff from both Marvel Comics and the Children's Television Workshop reviewed the stories to ensure they were faithful to the Electric Company and Marvel Comics casts, featured age-appropriate content and reading level and gave significant roles to female characters. Spider-Man signature artist John Romita, Sr. was the Marvel editor of the book and drew some of the covers. During the early years, a comic book version of one of The Electric Company Spidey skits was included. A truncated version also appeared in The Electric Company Magazine. In contrast to the live-action segments on The Electric Company, Spidey often appeared out of costume as Peter Parker.

Every issue of Spidey Super Stories featured at least one story where Spidey would team up with an established Marvel Comics superhero and/or fight an established Marvel villain. This served to introduce other Marvel characters to new readers who were unfamiliar with the company's characters prior to seeing Spider-Man on The Electric Company. Most of these stories would feature quick origins, usually taking up a single page or less, of both the featured hero and villain. Guest heroes included Iron Man, Captain America, Iceman, Doctor Strange, Spider-Woman, Nova, The Cat and Ms. Marvel. Guest villains included the Green Goblin, the Blizzard, Jack O'Lantern, and even Thanos.

Other stories in the issue would feature regular characters from The Electric Company, such as Easy Reader and detective Fargo North, Decoder, with Spidey as a supporting character; conversely, The Electric Company characters would sometimes appear as supporting characters in the Spidey-centric stories. Supporting characters from other Spider-Man comics made regular appearances as well, such as Peter Parker's girlfriend, Mary Jane Watson, and the staff of Parker's workplace, the Daily Bugle, most notably publisher and editor J. Jonah Jameson.

Marvel parodied Spidey Super Stories in a humorous issue of What If...? For two pages, an alternate universe is shown where Marvel had instead teamed up with the National Endowment of the Arts to produce Spidey Intellectual Stories, where Spider-Man defeats the Mad Thinker by debating philosophy. The Watcher notes that it "is for a [yawn] select audience, to be sure".

Record 
Spidey Super Stories also appeared as a special vinyl record in the 1970s licensed by Children's Television Workshop to Peter Pan Records. Included on the record are two stories from The Electric Company: "Spidey Versus Mr. Measles" and "The Queen Bee". Other stories include Spidey versus an evil toy-wielding criminal called the Jester in "The Last Laugh", The Purple Pirates and Evil MacWeevil in "The Leader of the Pack" (which includes a cameo of Fargo North, Decoder), and Spidey's origin story. Three other stories feature Spidey with members of the Short Circus, and Pedro and his guard-plant Maurice fighting the Mole Man in "20,000 Feet Under the Ground"; and the group tackling more traditional Marvel Comics villains in "Deadly is the Doctor Called Doom" and "Spidey Versus the Sandman". Due to the lack of a visual presentation, Spidey/Peter Parker would speak with audibly, as voiced by Jim Boyd. However, the album's artwork featured the traditional Spidey-talking technique of having his words in word balloons. Elements such as Spidey's spider-sense and the spider-tracer are used in these stories as well.

References

External links
 Danny Seagren at the Internet Movie Database, with episode listing

The Electric Company sketches
1974 American television series debuts
1977 American television series endings
PBS original programming
Defunct American comics
Spider-Man in television
Television shows based on Marvel Comics
Television series by Sesame Workshop
Television series by Sony Pictures Television